Shillong Lok Sabha constituency is one of the two Lok Sabha (parliamentary) constituencies in Meghalaya state in northeastern India.

Vidhan Sabha segments
Presently, Shillong Lok Sabha constituency comprises 36 Vidhan Sabha (legislative assembly) constituencies, which are:

Members of Lok Sabha
From  Autonomous Districts constituency, as part of Assam:

From Shillong constituency:

Election results

General Election 2019

General Election 2014

General Election 2009

General Election 2004

General Election 1977 
 Hoping Stone Lyngdoh (IND) : 55,732 votes  
 Peter Garnette Marbaniang (INC) : 50967 
 George Gilbert Swell (Ind) : 38841
 P Ripple Kyndiah (Ind) : 38,606

General Election 1967
 George Gilbert Swell (AHL) : 112,492 votes  
 B G Momin (INC) : 70,819

See also
 Shillong
 List of Constituencies of the Lok Sabha

References

External links
 Previous Lok Sabha Members by Constituency Lok Sabha website
Shillong lok sabha constituency election 2019 date and schedule

Lok Sabha constituencies in Meghalaya
Shillong